Mykhaylo Ivanovych Sokolovskyi (born 15 November 1951) is a Ukrainian professional football coach and a former player. Currently, he works as a scout for FC Metalurh Donetsk.

For the big number of games played for Shakhtar Donetsk he received the Club Loyalty Award in 1987. He was the most titled player of Shakhtar Donetsk during the Soviet Union, and he is considered to be one of the most legendary players in the history of the club.

Career statistics

Club

Honours
 Soviet Top League runner-up: 1975, 1979.
 Soviet Top League bronze: 1978.
 Soviet Cup winner: 1980, 1983.
 Soviet Cup finalist: 1986.

References

External links
 Career summary by KLISF

1951 births
Living people
People from Sloviansk
Soviet footballers
Ukrainian footballers
Soviet Top League players
FC Kramatorsk players
SKA Kiev players
FC Metalurh Zaporizhzhia players
FC Shakhtar Donetsk players
FC Krystal Kherson players
Ukrainian football managers
FC Shakhtar Donetsk non-playing staff
FC Metalurh Donetsk managers
Association football midfielders
Sportspeople from Donetsk Oblast